Two ships of the Royal New Zealand Navy have been named HMNZS Wellington after the national capital Wellington, the former Wellington Province, and/or the current Wellington Region:

 , a  that commissioned in 1987 and was sunk as a dive wreck in 2005.
 , a  currently in service.

Royal New Zealand Navy ship names